Marina Pylayeva (born 12 August 1966) is a Russian short track speed skater. She competed at the 1992 Winter Olympics, the 1994 Winter Olympics and the 1998 Winter Olympics.

References

1966 births
Living people
Russian female short track speed skaters
Olympic short track speed skaters of the Unified Team
Olympic short track speed skaters of Russia
Short track speed skaters at the 1992 Winter Olympics
Short track speed skaters at the 1994 Winter Olympics
Short track speed skaters at the 1998 Winter Olympics
People from Syktyvkar
Sportspeople from the Komi Republic
20th-century Russian women